MJS can refer to:
Minneapolis Japanese School
Milwaukee Journal Sentinel
Young Socialist Movement (French: Mouvement des Jeunes Socialistes), France
Movement of Young Socialists, Belgium
mjs, the ISO 639-3 code for the Miship language